Jan Palokaj (born 5 November 2000) is a Kosovan professional basketball player currently playing for Prishtina in the Kosovo Superleague and Balkan League.

International career
From 2016, until 2019, Palokaj has been part of Croatia at youth international level, respectively has been part of the U16, U18 and U20 teams. He also played in the 2016 FIBA U16 European Championship, 2017 FIBA U18 European Championship Division B and 2018 FIBA U18 European Championship.

On 25 January 2022, Prishtina announced that Palokaj and his teammate Jetmir Zeqiri have been provided with a Kosovo passport and have the right to play for the Kosovo national team.

References

External links
 Jan Palokaj Basketball Player Profile on ABAliga.com
 Jan Palokaj Basketball Player Profile on Eurobasket.com
 Jan Palokaj Basketball Player Profile on RealGM.com

2000 births
Living people
Basketball players from Zagreb
Kosovan men's basketball players
Croatian men's basketball players
Croatian expatriate basketball people in Kosovo
Naturalised citizens of Kosovo
Shooting guards
KK Zagreb players
KK Zadar players
KB Prishtina players
Croatian people of Albanian descent